Aghvan Varazdati Mkrtchyan (born 27 February 1981 in Yerevan, Soviet Union) is a former Armenian football defender. He was also a member of the Armenia national team, participated in 44 international matches and scored 1 goal since his debut in away friendly match against Andorra on 7 June 2002.

National team statistics

Achievements
 Pyunik Yerevan
 Armenian Premier League: 2002, 2003, 2004, 2005, 2006, 2007
 Armenian Cup: 2002, 2004
 Armenian Supercup: 2002, 2004, 2007
 Mika Yerevan
 Armenian Cup: 2011

External links
 
 
 
 

1981 births
Living people
Sportspeople from Yerevan
Armenian footballers
Association football defenders
Armenia international footballers
Armenian expatriate footballers
Armenian expatriate sportspeople in Iran
Expatriate footballers in Iran
Expatriate footballers in Belarus
Armenian Premier League players
FC Ararat Yerevan players
FC Pyunik players
Bargh Shiraz players
FC Gomel players
FC Mika players